Shekkarau I was a Sultan of Kano who reigned from 1290-1307.

Biography in the Kano Chronicle
Below is a biography of Shekkarau I from Palmer's 1908 English translation of the Kano Chronicle.

References

Monarchs of Kano